"Be with You." is BoA's twenty-fifth Japanese single. In addition to the title track are "Precious," instrumental versions of both songs, and the spring acoustic mix of "Be with You." The single was released on February 20, 2008. "The Face" was scheduled for release the same day, but was pushed back a week due to strong competition. "Be with You." is a ballad that is the theme song of "Inu to Watashi no 10 no Yakusoku." The single was leaked onto the internet on January 25, 2008.

Track list

CD
 Be with You. (5:13)
 Precious (5:10)
 Be with You. (Spring Acoustic Mix) (5:17)
 Be with You. (Instrumental) (5:13)
 Precious (Instrumental) (5:10)

CD extras
When the CD was inserted into the computer there were bonus extras.
 The Face (Special Digest Movie)

Hong Kong version
The Hong Kong edition included 3 more CD extras bonus than the Japanese version did.
 The Face (Special Digest Movie)- Aggressive
 Girl in the Mirror
 Happy Birthday
 Smile Again

Charts

Oricon Sales Chart (Japan)

Billboard (Japan)

References

2008 singles
BoA songs
Pop ballads
Torch songs
Japanese film songs
2008 songs
Avex Trax singles
Song articles with missing songwriters
2000s ballads